Daniel Boone Hotel may refer to:

 Daniel Boone Hotel (Boone, North Carolina), listed on the NRHP in North Carolina
Daniel Boone Hotel (Charleston, West Virginia), listed on the NRHP in West Virginia